Splash is a 1984 American fantasy romantic comedy film directed by Ron Howard, from a screenplay by Lowell Ganz, Babaloo Mandel, and Bruce Jay Friedman, and a story by Friedman and producer Brian Grazer, and starring Tom Hanks, Daryl Hannah, John Candy, and Eugene Levy. It involves a young man who falls in love with a mysterious woman who is secretly a mermaid. It was nominated for an Academy Award for Best Original Screenplay.

The film is notable for being the first film released by Touchstone Pictures, a film label created by Walt Disney Studios that same year in an effort to release films targeted at adult audiences, with mature content not appropriate for the studio's flagship Walt Disney Pictures banner. Splash received a PG-rating for some profanity and brief nudity. Splash was critically and commercially successful, earning over $69 million on an $11 million budget, and received praise for the acting, humor, and chemistry between Hanks and Hannah.

Plot 

In 1964, eight-year-old Allen Bauer and his family are taking a boat tour at Cape Cod. Allen is fascinated by something below the surface and jumps overboard. In the ocean, he encounters a young girl and inexplicably finds himself able to breathe underwater. However, Allen is rescued and pulled back to the surface, and the two are separated. Since no one else saw the girl, Allen comes to believe the encounter was a near-death hallucination.

In 1984, Allen is now co-owner of a wholesale fruit and vegetable business in New York City with his womanizing older brother Freddie. Through the years, Allen’s relationships have failed as he subconsciously seeks the connection he felt with the mysterious girl. Depressed after his latest breakup, Allen returns to Cape Cod, where he encounters eccentric scientist Dr. Walter Kornbluth on a diving expedition. When his motorboat malfunctions, Allen falls into the sea and is knocked unconscious; his wallet drops onto the coral below. He wakes up on a beach, in the presence of a beautiful naked woman who is unable to talk. After kissing him, she dives into the sea, where she transforms into a mermaid. While swimming underwater, she is sighted by Kornbluth.

The mermaid finds Allen's wallet, and uses a sunken ship’s charts to locate New York. She comes ashore naked at the Statue of Liberty and is arrested for indecent exposure. Using information from Allen’s wallet, the police contact him and the mysterious girl is released into his care. She learns how to speak English from watching television, and is eager to explore the city. Unable to say her real name in human language, she selects "Madison" from a Madison Avenue sign. She tells Allen that she will be in New York for "six fun-filled days until the moon is full"; unable to return home if she stays any longer. Despite Madison's occasionally outlandish behavior, she and Allen fall in love. Allen proposes to Madison, but she declines and runs away. After some contemplation, Madison returns to Allen and agrees to marry him, with the added promise of telling him the truth about herself after an upcoming dignitary dinner to welcome the President.

Meanwhile, Kornbluth, realizing that the naked woman at Liberty Island was the mermaid he encountered, pursues the couple, trying to expose her as a mermaid by splashing her with water. His first attempts are unsuccessful, and Kornbluth ends up with multiple injuries. Finally, he infiltrates the dignitary dinner, splashing Madison with a hose and successfully unmasking her identity. Madison is seized by government agents and taken to a secret lab, headed by Kornbluth's cold-hearted rival Dr. Ross for examination. As Madison withers away in captivity, Kornbluth learns that the scientists are planning to dissect her; causing him to regret his actions, for he just wanted to prove that he wasn’t crazy rather than cause actual harm.

Allen is shocked by Madison's secret and rejects her, but when he voices his disillusionment to his brother, Freddie lashes out at him, reminding Allen how happy he was with her. Realizing that he still loves Madison, Allen confronts the guilt-ridden Kornbluth, who having been rejected by his colleagues despite his discovery, agrees to help rescue her.

Impersonating Swedish scientists, Allen, Freddie, and Kornbluth enter the lab and smuggle Madison outside. Freddie decides to be arrested in Allen's place, while Kornbluth unsuccessfully tries to stop United States troops from catching the couple. Despite being pursued, Allen and Madison make it to New York Harbor. Madison tells Allen that he can survive underwater as long as he is with her, causing Allen to realize that she was the girl he had met underwater as a child. Madison warns him that if he comes to live in the sea, he cannot return to land. She jumps in the water when the troops close in on them. When more troops attempt to arrest Allen, he jumps into the water after her, but starts to drown as he cannot swim. Madison kisses him, gifting him the ability to swim and breathe underwater. Frogmen enter the water to recapture Madison and Allen, but the couple fight them off and escape. Allen discards his jacket, forsaking his miserable life on the surface and the couple happily swims toward what appears to be an underwater kingdom.

Cast 

 Tom Hanks as Allen Bauer
 David Kreps as Young Allen
 Daryl Hannah as Madison
 Shayla MacKarvich as Young Madison
 Eugene Levy as Dr. Walter Kornbluth
 John Candy as Freddie Bauer
 Jason Late as Young Freddie
 Dody Goodman as Mrs. Stimler
 Shecky Greene as Mr. Buyrite
 Richard B. Shull as Dr. Ross
 Bobby Di Cicco as Jerry
 Howard Morris as Dr. Zidell
 Tony DiBenedetto as Tim the Doorman
 Patrick Cronin as Michaelson
 Charles Walker as Michaelson's Partner
 David Knell as Claude
 Jeff Doucette as Junior
 Royce D. Applegate as Buckwalter
 Tony Longo as Augie
 Nora Denney as Mrs. Stein
 Charles Macaulay as the President
 Joe Grifasi as Manny
 Lee Delano as Sergeant Lelandowski
 Migdia Chinea Varela as Wanda
 Eileen Saki as Dr. Fujimoto
 Jodi Long as Reporter
 Bill Smitrovich as Ralph Bauer
 Nancy Raffa as Nancy Bauer
 Pete Cody as Boy Pointing at Dolphin
 Than Wyenn as Mr. Ambrose

Cameos 
Screenwriters Lowell Ganz and Babaloo Mandel both make cameo appearances in the film. Ganz plays Stan the Tour Guide in the scene set at the Statue of Liberty. Mandel plays the man in charge of ice skate rentals who tackles Tom Hanks' character when he tries to run out with his skates still on. Director Ron Howard's father, actor Rance Howard, can be seen early in the film as Mr. McCullough, an unhappy customer screaming at Allen about his cherries. Howard's brother Clint Howard can be seen as a wedding guest, identified by Candy's character as the bride's brother and yelled at by Hanks.

Production 
The film was initially set up at United Artists, but Grazer decided to take the film elsewhere and took it to The Ladd Company, but Alan Ladd Jr. eventually passed on it. According to the documentary on the Splash: 20th Anniversary Edition DVD in 2004, producer Brian Grazer had pitched the film to numerous studios but was turned down repeatedly until Walt Disney Productions, then headed by Ron W. Miller, agreed to produce the film. The key to the proposal's success was that Grazer changed the premise description from the idea of a mermaid adjusting to life in New York City to that about a love story about an ordinary man in New York City meeting a mermaid. An issue at the time of production was the competition between Splash and another announced (but unnamed) mermaid film from Warner Bros. that had lined up Warren Beatty as its star. Director Ron Howard promised the studio that Splash would be filmed more quickly and cheaply than the other film, which eventually fell through. Howard turned down directing Footloose and Mr. Mom to direct Splash. Many big name actors such as Jeff Bridges, Chevy Chase, Richard Gere, Dudley Moore, Michael Keaton, Kevin Kline, Bill Murray, and John Travolta were all considered for the lead role before the producers decided on the then lesser-known Tom Hanks. Murray turned down the part as he wanted to move away from comedies and do serious films instead. Steve Guttenberg also auditioned for the role. Before Daryl Hannah was cast as Madison, it had already been turned down by Tatum O'Neal, Michelle Pfeiffer, Julia Louis-Dreyfus, Genie Francis, Melanie Griffith, Fiona Fullerton, P.J. Soles, Diane Lane, Kathleen Turner, and Sharon Stone.

Principal photography began on March 1, 1983 and completed on June 30, 1983 in Los Angeles, California and New York City, New York. The beach where Hanks first encounters the nude Hannah is on the former Gorda Cay in the Bahamas, which now is known as Castaway Cay, the private island of Disney Cruise Line.

Hannah's mermaid tail was designed and created by Academy Award-winning visual effects artist Robert Short. The tail was fully functional. Hannah swam with the mermaid tail so fast that her safety team could not keep pace with her. According to the DVD documentary, Hannah had been swimming "mermaid" style with her legs bound together since she was a child, due to her fascination with Hans Christian Andersen's "The Little Mermaid" story. However, the exceptionally detailed film tail was difficult to remove. For the sake of efficiency, Hannah at first kept it on while the cast had lunch. In the documentary included on the 20th-anniversary Splash DVD, Hanks recalled how the other cast members would drop French fries over the side of the tank to her as though she were a trained sea mammal, because she could not leave the water while her legs were "shrink-wrapped".

Reception 
Produced on a $11 million budget, Splash grossed $6.2 million in its opening weekend and finished its run with a gross of $69.8 million in the United States and Canada, making it the tenth highest-grossing film of 1984. The movie was also well received by critics and is considered to be one of the best films of 1984. It earned a  "Fresh" rating from the review aggregate website Rotten Tomatoes based on  reviews. The site's consensus states: "A perfectly light, warmly funny romantic comedy that's kept afloat by Ron Howard's unobtrusive direction and charming performances from Tom Hanks and Daryl Hannah." Metacritic gave the film a score of 71 based on 15 reviews, indicating "generally favorable reviews". A negative review came from Roger Ebert of The Chicago Sun-Times who gave the movie 1.5 stars out of 4 and thought the film's biggest failing was casting then-unknown Hanks as the lead rather than the established comedy star John Candy: "They should have made Candy the lover, and Hanks the brother. Then we'd be on the side of this big lunk who suddenly has a mermaid drop into his life."

Colin Greenland reviewed Splash for Imagine magazine, and stated that "Splash is an adult film that has the grace to treat fantasy with sensitivity and a sense of humour."

Awards 

American Film Institute Lists
 AFI's 100 Years...100 Laughs – Nominated
 AFI's 100 Years...100 Passions – Nominated
 AFI's 10 Top 10 – Nominated Fantasy Film

Soundtrack releases 
A soundtrack album of Lee Holdridge's music for the film was released on both vinyl LP and cassette in the United Kingdom by Cherry Lane Records Ltd in 1984, with the music re-recorded by the Royal Philharmonic Orchestra conducted by the composer. Both have been out of print for many years. The catalogue numbers for these releases were PIPLP 710 and ZCPIP 710 respectively. In 2000, the original music was released on a twenty-six track CD in the United States by Super Tracks Music Group. The back cover states that this product is "For Promotional Use Only" and that it has been "Manufactured for the composer...". Although this release is very hard to find brand new and may in fact be out of print, it is still obtainable from certain movie soundtrack specialist retailers and also occasionally used from certain online stores. This CD has every track that the LP and cassette have but has a considerably longer running length due to the twelve extra tracks. These extra tracks include more of the original music from the film, the theme song (by Lee Holdridge and Will Jennings) sung by Rita Coolidge and alternate versions of some of the tracks which appear on the LP and Cassette. The catalogue number for this release is LH CD – 02.

Cherry Lane album track listing 
  "Love Came For Me (Love Theme)" (2:34)
  "Madison in Bloomingdale's" (1:37)
  "Mermaid On the Beach" (2:32)
  "Underwater" (2:20)
  "Reflection" (1:03)
  "Rainy Night" (2:40)
  "Face to Face" (1:25)
  "Escape and Chase" (2:54)
  "Madison and Allen" (3:04)
  "Moonlit Night" (2:56)
  "Daydream" (:55)
  "Raid On a Museum" (:50)
  "The Leap to Freedom" (3:35)
  "Return Home" (1:23)

Super Tracks album track listing 
 "Main Title" (1:51)
 "First Meeting" (1:33)
 "The Boat/Mermaid On the Beach" (2:34)
 "Underwater – Version No. 1" (1:29)
 "Underwater – Version No. 2" (1:25)
 "Daydream" (:57)
 "Madison At Bloomingdale's" (1:09)
 "In the Bar" (2:12)
 "Late At Night" (2:35)
 "Watching TV" (1:24)
 "I Love You" (1:41)
 "Rainy Night" (2:38)
 "All Wet" (1:07)
 "Sneak Attack" (1:03)
 "Raid On a Museum" (:43)
 "Reunion" (1:21)
 "Escape and Chase" (2:55)
 "The Leap For Freedom" (2:20)
 "Return Home" (2:14)
 "Love Came For Me (Love Theme) – Rita Coolidge" (4:30)
 "End Title" (3:07)
 "Rainy Night – Version No. 2" (2:37)
 "Escape and Chase – Film Version" (2:54)
 "The Leap For Freedom – Film Version" (2:20)
 "Love Came For Me – Solo Sax Version" (2:36)
 "Love Came For Me – Solo Guitar Version" (3:48)

Legacy 
Steven Levitt and Stephen Dubner's book Freakonomics (2006) credits the film with popularizing the name "Madison" for girls, as does Steven Pinker's The Stuff of Thought (2007). In the film, Daryl Hannah's character takes her name from Madison Avenue (itself named after President James Madison) after walking past a road sign. Hanks' character comments that it is not a real name as, at the time, it was a rather unusual name for a woman. However, in the years since the film was released in theatres and re-released on VHS and then DVD, the name's popularity has skyrocketed.

According to the Social Security Administration, the name "Madison" was the 216th most popular name in the United States for girls in 1990, the 29th most popular name for girls in 1995, and the 3rd most popular name for girls in 2000. In 2005, the name finally cracked the top 50 most popular girls' names in the United Kingdom, and articles in British newspapers credit the film for the popularization. In a 2014 interview, Hannah commented on the irony of the name's popularity and subsequent acceptance as a standard first name given its origins as a joke based on Madison being primarily known as a street name at the time:

It's funny because no one understands the irony, because the whole point of me choosing that name was because it [was such a] silly name...Obviously everyone knew it as the name of the street. No one really saw it as a first name and that was a joke. And now, of course it's not funny at all. It's just like, 'Oh, what a beautiful name!'…It was funny at the time and now it's not even ironic.

Spinoffs 
 Splash, Too (directed by Greg Antonacci), was a television film released in 1988 (contradicting the first movie's finale revelation that if Allen goes to live in the sea, he can never return) starring Todd Waring as Allen Bauer, Amy Yasbeck as Madison, and Donovan Scott as Freddie Bauer. Only one member of the original cast, Dody Goodman, the Bauers' ditzy office assistant Mrs. Stimler, reprises her role.
 A novelization of the film, written by Ian Marter (under the pen name Ian Don), was published by Target Books in the United Kingdom.

Remake 
In 2016, producer Brian Grazer said he was working on a remake of Splash, although this version would be told from the point-of-view of the mermaid, which was more in line with the earlier drafts of the original film. Jillian Bell and Channing Tatum were set to star with Bell as a female human and Tatum as a merman. Tatum was also set to produce the remake through his production company, Free Association, along with Reid Carolin and Peter Kieran, while Howard and Grazer will also produce from  Imagine Entertainment with Anna Culp as the executive producer and Marja-Lewis Ryan writing. , the project was still in development. On February 8, 2023, it was reported that Sarah Rothschild will write the script

See also 

 Mermaids in popular culture

References

External links 

 
 
 
 
 
 
 

1980s American films
1980s English-language films
1984 films
1984 comedy-drama films
1984 romantic comedy films
1984 romantic drama films
1980s fantasy comedy-drama films
1980s romantic comedy-drama films
1980s romantic fantasy films
American fantasy comedy-drama films
American romantic comedy-drama films
American romantic fantasy films
Films about brothers
Films about mermaids
Films directed by Ron Howard
Films produced by Brian Grazer
Films scored by Lee Holdridge
Films set in the 1960s
Films set in 1964
Films set in the 1980s
Films set in 1984
Films set in New York City
Films shot in the Bahamas
Films shot in Los Angeles
Films shot in New York City
Films with screenplays by Babaloo Mandel
Films with screenplays by Bruce Jay Friedman
Films with screenplays by Lowell Ganz
Films with underwater settings
Mad scientist films
Touchstone Pictures films